Varat Aali Gharat is a Marathi movie released on 24 February 2009. The movie is produced by Krushnanand
and directed by Vijay Gokhale.

Cast 
The cast includes Bharat Jadhav, Klka Kubal Aathalye, Vijay Gokhle, Neelam Shirke, Anshuman Vichare, Prajakta Hanmdhar, Ajita Kulkarni, Jaywant Bhalekar & Others.

Soundtrack
The music is provided by Dyanesh Kumar.

References 

2009 films
2000s Marathi-language films